Metachanda argentinigrella is a moth in the oecophorine tribe Metachandini. It was described by Henry Legrand in 1965. Its type locality is on Mahé Island in the Seychelles.

References

Oecophorinae
Moths described in 1965
Moths of Seychelles